The Arbalète (alternatively written L'Arbalète) was an express train that linked Paris-Est in Paris, France, with Zürich HB in Zurich, Switzerland.  Introduced in 1957, it was operated by the SNCF and the Swiss Federal Railways (SBB-CFF-FFS).

The train was named after the crossbow used by William Tell to hit the apple on his son's head.

Originally, and for 22 years, the Arbalète was a first-class-only Trans Europ Express (TEE).  On 27 May 1979, it became a two-class InterCity (IC) train, and on 31 May 1987, it was included in the then-new EuroCity (EC) network.  It was discontinued in September 1997, replaced by a TGV service that was routed via Pontarlier and Bern instead of Mulhouse and Basel.

See also

 History of rail transport in France
 History of rail transport in Switzerland
 List of named passenger trains of Europe

References

Notes

Bibliography
 
 
 

EuroCity
International named passenger trains
Named passenger trains of France
Named passenger trains of Switzerland
Trans Europ Express
Railway services introduced in 1957
Railway services discontinued in 1997